The McVeggie is a veggie burger sold by the fast-food restaurant chain McDonald's. It was introduced in 2012 in India when McDonald's opened its first vegetarian-only restaurant in the country.

Description 

The vegetarian-based burger contains a battered and breaded patty which is made of peas, corn, carrots, green beans, onions, potatoes, rice and spices, served in a sesame toasted bun with eggless mayonnaise and lettuce.

History 
During the widespread of vegetarianism in India on 2012, McDonald's opened its first vegetarian-only restaurant and served McVeggie. They also serve it in Hong Kong, Germany in February 2010, South Australia in May 2019, Finland and Sweden in 2017, Belgium and Greece, Malaysia, Portugal in 2016, Switzerland, and in New Zealand as of December 2019.

Reception 
The McVeggie has received mixed reviews. While the trend meat eaters to eat more "flexitarian" was successful, according to the New Zealand Vegetarian Society, the offer of a McVeggie was not quite vegetarian and it represented a "missed opportunity". McDonald's website ended up with them claiming the burger is "Not vegetarian due to our cooking method". When the New Zealand Vegetarian Society shared a post on Facebook about the McVeggie for people's opinion, multiple user complained and claimed it misleading, and expressed their annoyance that they are unable to consume the burger as it was contaminated with meat. While some people said that they feel the burger is a tiny step in the right direction, some of them described it as "disappointing", and some also said that "They have made completely the wrong call, the world is moving towards plant-based eating and this is so off the mark, it's almost funny".

In Sweden and Portugal, McVeggie was replaced by the McPlant in 2022.

References

McDonald's foods
Products introduced in 2012
Meat substitutes
Food and drink introduced in 2012